Trevor R. Shaw, OBE (born 31 March 1928) is an English historian and speleologist.

An "assiduous compiler of data on caves", Shaw has published over 230 books and scientific articles during the course of his career, including detailed biographies and studies into the life of early speleologist Édouard-Alfred Martel.

References

1928 births
British speleologists
English historians
Place of birth missing (living people)
Living people